The 121st Pioneers were an infantry regiment of the East India Company's Bombay Army and later the British Indian Army. The regiment traces their origins to 1777, when they were raised as the Marine Battalion.

The regiments first action was in the Anglo-Persian War, they returned to the Gulf when they were used in the punitive expedition in the Beni Boo Ali campaign in 1821, against the pirates in Eastern Arabia and the Persian Gulf. They were involved in a number of campaigns following this the conquest of Sindh including the Battle of Hyderabad in 1843. The Second Anglo-Sikh War in 1848, the Second Anglo-Burmese War in 1852 and the 1868 Expedition to Abyssinia. During World War I the regiment served in the Mesopotamia Campaign and the Sinai and Palestine Campaigns.

After World War I the Indian government reformed the army moving from single battalion regiments to multi battalion regiments. In 1922, the 121st Pioneers became the 10th (Marine) Battalion, 2nd Bombay Pioneers. The regiment was disbanded in 1932.

Predecessor names
Marine Battalion - 1777
1st (Marine) Battalion, 11th Regiment of Bombay Native Infantry - 1818
21st (Marine) Regiment of Bombay Native Infantry - 1824
21st Bombay Infantry (The Marine Battalion) - 1885
121st Pioneers

References

Moberly, F.J. (1923). Official History of the War: Mesopotamia Campaign, Imperial War Museum. 

British Indian Army infantry regiments
Military units and formations established in 1777
Military units and formations disestablished in 1922
Bombay Presidency